Swan Island may refer to:

Places

Australia
 Little Swan Island, Tasmania, Australia
 Swan Island (Tasmania), Australia
 Swan Island (Victoria), Australia

Falkland Islands
 Swan Islands, Falkland Islands
 Weddell Island, formerly Swan Island, Falkland Islands

Honduras
 Swan Islands, Honduras

Ukraine
 Swan Islands in Karkinit Bay, off northwestern Crimean coast

United Kingdom
 Swan Island, London
 Swan Island, County Down, townland in County Down, Northern Ireland
 Swan Island, County Antrim, townland in County Antrim, Northern Ireland

United States
 Swan Island (Alaska)
 Swan Island (Chesapeake Bay), Chesapeake Bay 
 Swan Island (Oregon)
 Swan Island Site, Illinois
 Swan's Island, Maine
 Swan Island (Michigan)

Other
 Swan Island (band), rock band from Portland, Oregon
 Little Swan Island hutia, extinct species of rodent 
 Île des Cygnes (disambiguation)